Blaine Francis Nye (born March 29, 1946) is a former American football offensive lineman in the National Football League (NFL) for the Dallas Cowboys. He played college football at Stanford University.

Early years
Born in Ogden, Utah, Nye played football at Servite High School in Anaheim, California, and graduated in 1964.

He accepted a football scholarship from Stanford University. As a sophomore in 1965, he played offensive tackle and also some snaps at defensive end. 

As a junior, he was moved to defensive tackle four days before the start of the season. He led the team with 104 tackles and received honorable-mention All-Pac-8 honors.

As a senior in 1967, he made All-AAWU Athletic Association of Western Universities Honorable-Mention, while earning a B.A. in physics. He also played rugby.

He was inducted into the Stanford Athletic Hall of Fame, the Stanford All-Century football team and to the Orange County Sports Hall Of Fame.

Professional career
Nye was selected by the Dallas Cowboys in the fifth round (130th overall) of the 1968 NFL/AFL draft as a defensive tackle. During the 1970 season, with the team needing help on the offensive line, he was switched to offensive guard and replaced John Wilbur. He played mainly on special teams in his first 2 seasons.

In 1970, he was named the starter at right guard, between future Hall of Famer offensive tackle Rayfield Wright and center Dave Manders. In 1972, he was named to the Newspaper Enterprise Association All-Pro team. In 1976, he was named to the All-NFC team and the Pro Bowl. He announced his retirement on July 23, 1977.

Nye helped anchor a dominant offensive line that led the Cowboys to three Super Bowls. He played in 125 games during his nine-year career with the Cowboys, including the three Super Bowls and two Pro Bowls. Nye retired at the end of the 1976 season (after the Pro Bowl in January) and was replaced by Tom Rafferty.

Nye was widely considered one of the smartest players in the NFL. Amidst the time and pressure of regular-season play, he earned two master's degrees. Inside the team, he founded the "Zero Club", which prided itself on performing behind the scenes. Its first rule, "Thou Shalt Not Seek Publicity," kept its members (Nye, Larry Cole, and Pat Toomay) out of the limelight. Although he didn't seek publicity, he is also known for providing some of the team's famous quotes:
 "Offensive linemen are like salt. Nobody ever remembers the brand they buy."
 After Clint Longley's famous comeback win over the Washington Redskins on Thanksgiving Day in 1974, a reporter asked him what the game meant, his answer was "This game represents the triumph of the uncluttered mind."

Personal life
During the offseasons, Nye earned a M.S. in physics from the University of Washington in Seattle in 1970, and an M.B.A. from Stanford University in 1974. After retiring from football in 1976, he earned a Ph.D. in finance from Stanford in 1981. His dissertation was titled "Demand and Pricing for Health Care and Guaranteed Insurability".

In 1981, Nye founded Stanford Consulting Group, Inc. He performs numerous economic analyses and research, and provides expert testimony in multiple areas including securities litigation, intellectual property, business litigation, damages, and insurance economics.

References

External links

 
 Sports Reference – collegiate statistic – Blaine Nye
 Stanford Consulting Group – Blaine Nye

1946 births
Living people
Sportspeople from Ogden, Utah
Players of American football from Utah
American football offensive guards
Stanford Cardinal football players
Dallas Cowboys players
National Conference Pro Bowl players
Servite High School alumni
University of Washington alumni
Stanford Graduate School of Business alumni